Foscote may refer to several places in England:
 Foscott, Buckinghamshire, also known as Foscote
 Foscote, Northamptonshire
 Foscote, Wiltshire

See also
Foscot, Oxfordshire